Out My Way is an EP by the alternative rock band the Meat Puppets, released in 1986. It features a more hard rock-oriented sound than on previous releases, leading some critics to say that the sound is similar to the southern/hard rock stylings of ZZ Top. The EP was reissued in 1999 by Rykodisc, with additional bonus tracks.

Production
The cover art is by Curt Kirkwood. The EP was issued while Curt recovered from a broken finger.

Critical reception
AllMusic wrote that "the EP showed that the Puppets were moving on from their early punk sound to a more traditional rock direction." Robert Christgau called the EP "a departure, toward a less spacy, more bottomy hardcore-gone-folkloric." Trouser Press praised "an utterly crazed raveup of 'Good Golly Miss Molly,'” writing that it "merely caps off a diverse collection of occasionally funky, occasionally psychedelic, occasionally countryfied rock tunes."

Track listing
All songs written by Curt Kirkwood, unless otherwise noted.

Original album

"She's Hot" (Curt Kirkwood, Cris Kirkwood) – 4:05
"Out My Way" – 4:47
"Other Kinds of Love" (Curt Kirkwood, Cris Kirkwood) – 4:22
"Not Swimming Ground" (Curt Kirkwood, Cris Kirkwood) – 4:07
"Mountain Line" – 4:20
"Good Golly Miss Molly" (Robert "Bumps" Blackwell, John Marascalco) – 4:08

CD reissue bonus tracks

"Good Golly Miss Molly" (Robert "Bumps" Blackwell, John Marascalco) – 2:50
"I Just Want to Make Love to You" (Willie Dixon) – 3:55
"On the Move" – 3:50
"Burn the Honky Tonk Down" (Wayne Kemp) – 1:59
"Boyhood Home" – 3:17
"Backwards Drums" – 4:20
"Everything is Green" – 8:39
"Other Kinds of Love" (Demo Version) – 0:52

References

Meat Puppets albums
1986 EPs
SST Records EPs